Bob Bryan and Mike Bryan were the defending champions, but lost in the semifinals to Mahesh Bhupathi and Pavel Vízner.

Mahesh Bhupathi and Pavel Vízner won in the final 6–4, 6–4 against Paul Hanley and Kevin Ullyett.

Seeds
All seeds receive a bye into the second round.

Draw

Finals

Top half

Bottom half

External links
 Doubles draw

Masters - Doubles